His Majesty may refer to:
 Majesty, a style used by monarchs
 Charles III, King of the United Kingdom and Commonwealth
 His Majesty (comic opera), an 1897 English comic opera
 His Majesty (band)
 His Majesty (horse) (1968–1995), American Thoroughbred racehorse
 London, Brighton and South Coast Railway no. 42 His Majesty, an LB&SCR B4 class 4-4-0 tender locomotive

See also
 
 
 Majesty (disambiguation)
 Her Majesty (disambiguation)
 His Imperial Majesty